The Wisconsin–Oshkosh Titans football program is the intercollegiate American football team for the University of Wisconsin–Oshkosh located in the Oshkosh, Wisconsin. Wisconsin–Oshkosh competes at the NCAA Division III level and is a member of the Wisconsin Intercollegiate Athletic Conference (WIAC).

Notable former players
 Marty Below
 Ron Cardo
 Pahl Davis
 Lester Leitl
 Hal Robl
 Eber Simpson
 John Thome
 Milt Wilson

References

External links
 

 
American football teams established in 1893
1893 establishments in Wisconsin